Davidson Wildcats basketball may refer to either of the basketball teams that represent Davidson College:

Davidson Wildcats men's basketball
Davidson Wildcats women's basketball